This is a list of Carlton Football Club players who have made one or more appearance in the Australian Football League (AFL), known as the Victorian Football League (VFL) until 1990. Carlton were one of the foundation clubs for the inaugural VFL season in 1897.

Carlton Football Club players

1890s

1900s

1910s

1920s

1930s

1940s

1950s

1960s

1970s

1980s

1990s

2000s

2010s

2020s

Listed players yet to make their debut for Carlton

See also
List of Carlton Football Club coaches

References
AFL Tables – All Time Player List – Carlton

Players

Carlton
Carlton Football Club players